Sensation Seekers is a 1927 American silent romantic drama film directed by Lois Weber, produced and distributed by Universal Pictures and starring Billie Dove.

The film and a trailer survive.

Cast

References

External links

9 minute portion of Sensation Seekers available for free download at Internet Archive
 
Several lobby posters: #1(Wayback), #2, and #3 (Wayback)
Still at silentfilmstillarchive.com
Still at moma.org

1927 films
American silent feature films
Films directed by Lois Weber
Universal Pictures films
1927 romantic drama films
American black-and-white films
American romantic drama films
1920s American films
Silent romantic drama films
Silent American drama films